The Battle of Matamondo was fought during the East African Campaign of World War I.

References

External links
British Campaigns in Africa and Pacific-https://archive.org/stream/britishcampaigns00dane/britishcampaigns00dane_djvu.txt

Battles of the East African Campaign
Battles of World War I involving Germany
November 1916 events
1916 in Africa